The Irish League in season 1896–97 comprised 6 teams, and Glentoran won the championship.

League standings

Results

References
Northern Ireland - List of final tables (RSSSF)

1896-97
1896–97 domestic association football leagues
Lea